Bathytroctes is a genus of slickheads that occur in the depths of the oceans.

Species
There are currently 11 recognized species in this genus:
 Bathytroctes breviceps Sazonov, 1999
 Bathytroctes elegans Sazonov & Ivanov, 1979
 Bathytroctes inspector Garman, 1899
 Bathytroctes macrognathus Sazonov, 1999
 Bathytroctes macrolepis Günther, 1887 (Koefoed's smooth-head)
 Bathytroctes michaelsarsi Koefoed, 1927 (Michael Sars' smooth-head)
 Bathytroctes microlepis Günther, 1878 (Smallscale smooth-head)
 Bathytroctes oligolepis (G. Krefft, 1970)
 Bathytroctes pappenheimi (Fowler, 1934)
 Bathytroctes squamosus Alcock, 1890 (Deepscale slickhead)
 Bathytroctes zugmayeri Fowler, 1934 (Zugmayer's slickhead)

References

 
Ray-finned fish genera
Taxa named by Albert Günther